Cycling events have been contested at every Asian Games since the 1951 Asian Games in New Delhi, with the exception of the 1954 Games.

Editions

Events

BMX

Mountain bike

Road

Track

Medal table

List of medalists

List of records

External links 
Asian Cycling Federation

 
Sports at the Asian Games
Asian Games
Asian Games